BAP Talismán was an iron hull ship transport of the Peruvian Navy built in Glasgow. During the War of the Pacific (1879–1883) Talismán was one of several ships that supplied Peru with war material that arrived from the United States, Europe and Costa Rica to Panamá.
With the blockade of Callao and after the defeats at the battle of San Juan and Chorrillos and the battle of Miraflores, the ship was sunk by its own crew with the rest of the Peruvian fleet to prevent it from falling into enemy hands.

References

Ships built in Glasgow
Auxiliary ships of the Peruvian Navy
Ships of the War of the Pacific
Shipwrecks in the Pacific Ocean
Maritime incidents in January 1881
Shipwrecks of the War of the Pacific
Scuttled vessels of Peru
1872 ships